Eucodoniidae is a family of hydrozoans belonging to the order Anthoathecata.

Genera:
 Eucodonium Hartlaub, 1907

References

Filifera
Cnidarian families